Rakovci is a settlement in the Slovene Hills in the Municipality of Sveti Tomaž in northeastern Slovenia. The area traditionally belonged to the Styria region and is now included in the Drava Statistical Region.

The Neo-Gothic village chapel-shrine with a belfry was built in 1888.

References

External links
Rakovci on Geopedia

Populated places in the Municipality of Sveti Tomaž